Caenides soritia, the well-spotted recluse, is a species of butterfly in the family Hesperiidae. It is found in Guinea, Sierra Leone, Liberia, Ivory Coast, Ghana, Nigeria, Cameroon, Bioko, Gabon and possibly Malawi. The habitat consists of forests.

The larvae feed on Elaeis guineensis and Zingiber species.

References

Butterflies described in 1876
Hesperiinae
Butterflies of Africa
Taxa named by William Chapman Hewitson